The WOR Radio Network was a slate of nationally syndicated radio programming produced and distributed by flagship radio station WOR in New York City. The programming was primarily general interest commercial talk; only one non-talk program had ever been carried on the network, WAER's "Big Bands, Ballads and Blues".

Following the sale of WOR to Clear Channel Communications in 2012, most of the remaining programming on the WOR Radio Network migrated to Radio America.

Schedule
The WOR Radio Network operated two separate feeds, WOR-1 and WOR-2. WOR-2 ceased in the late 2000s due to a lack of overlapping programming. The schedule of live feeds, as of September 2012:

Weekdays
 Noon–3pm ET: Dr. Joy Browne

Saturdays
 Noon–2pm ET: Dr. Ronald Hoffman
 2–4pm ET: The Car Doctor with Ron Ananian
 4–6pm ET: The Pet Show with Warren Eckstein

Sundays
 8–10am ET: Easy Gardening with Mark Viette
 10am – noon ET: Food Talk with Michael Colameco
 Noon–2pm ET: The Travel Show with Arthur Frommer

The remainder of the network feed consisted of rebroadcasts and "best of" shows.

Former hosts
The Dolans
Bob Grant
Joan Hamburg
Lionel
Steve Malzberg
Joey Reynolds
Dave Graveline

References

Radio stations disestablished in 2012
Defunct radio networks in the United States
Defunct radio stations in the United States